Makkah Al Mukarramah Library is a library near the Masjid al-Haram in Mecca, Saudi Arabia. Since it is believed to stand on the spot where the Islamic prophet Muhammad was born, it is also known as Bayt al-Mawlid.

History

Ancient 

Aminah bint Wahb ibn Abd Manaf is believed to have given birth to Muhammad in the month of Rabi' al-Awwal, circa 53 B.H. or 570 C.E. Her husband, Abdullah ibn Abd al-Muttalib, had died three to six months prior.

Modern 

After consulting senior scholars, 'Abdul-'Aziz bin 'Abdul-Rahman Al Saud, the founding king of modern Saudi Arabia, established the modern library over the site of Muhammad's birth.

See also 
 Church of the Nativity, birthplace of 'Isa (Jesus)
 Family tree of Muhammad
 The Green Dome over the tomb of Muhammad

References

External links 

 Birthplace of the Prophet (ﷺ)
 Birthplace of the Prophet Muhammad ﷺ on YouTube
 Bayt al Mawlid/Geburtsort des Propheten s.a.v

Buildings and structures in Mecca
History of Islam
History of Mecca
Islamic buildings
Libraries in Saudi Arabia
Life of Muhammad